Atlas of Remote Islands: Fifty Islands I Have Never Set Foot On and Never Will is a book by Judith Schalansky originally published in Germany in 2009 by Mare Verlag. The atlas contains maps of 50 islands chosen by the author with accompanying descriptions of their natural and human histories, often written in a subjective, impressionistic style. It was the winner of the prize for the most beautiful German book of the year in 2009, the German Design Award in 2011, and the Red Dot Design Award in 2011. The English translation by Christine Lo was published by Penguin Books in 2010 under this title or (in 2012) as Pocket Atlas of Remote Islands: Fifty Islands I Have Not Visited and Never Will.

The book is divided in chapters for each ocean, presenting the islands in this order:

References

2009 non-fiction books
Geography books
Lists of islands
Atlases
German non-fiction books